Digermulen Church is a parish church of the Church of Norway in Vågan Municipality in Nordland county, Norway. It is located in the village of Digermulen on the island of Hinnøya. It is one of the churches for the Svolvær parish which is part of the Lofoten prosti (deanery) in the Diocese of Sør-Hålogaland. The white, concrete church was built in an octagonal style in 1951 using plans drawn up by the architects Andreas Melchior Wiel Nygaardand Torstein Schyberg. The church seats about 250 people.

See also
List of churches in Sør-Hålogaland
Octagonal churches in Norway

References

Vågan
Churches in Nordland
Octagonal churches in Norway
20th-century Church of Norway church buildings
Churches completed in 1951
1951 establishments in Norway
Concrete churches in Norway